Texila American University Zambia is a private University, established in 2016 that offers quality education with a wide range of career-focused programs. The University is approved by Higher Education Authority – Ministry of Higher Education, Zambia, Health Professional Council of Zambia (HPCZ) and Listed in Zambia Chamber of Commerce and Industry (ZACCI) and International Council for Open and Distance Education. The campus is spread across 25,000 sq. ft of academic space with state-of-the-art infrastructure. Texila American University offers Bachelor of Medicine, Bachelor of Surgery (MBCHB), Masters in Public Health (MPH), Bachelors in Business Management (BBA), Masters in Business Management (MBA). Texila American University is also ranked as top University in Zambia.

Academics

Texila American University (TAU) offers a multidisciplinary academic programs in Diploma, Bachelors & Masters levels in the field of Medicine, Allied Health Sciences, Business Management, Information Technology which is approved by Higher Education Authority of Zambia.

Medicine Programs 
TAU is one of the top-notch medical schools in Zambia, offering exceptional training for students wishing to pursue medical programs. With a rigorous curriculum at par with international standards that resonates with the contemporary global healthcare landscape and delivery models, equipping students to practice medicine in a collaborative interdisciplinary setting.
With world-class infrastructure and employing the latest tools and teachings, we help students evolve and make an impact as exceptional healthcare providers, caregivers, and scientists, enabling Texila American University to consistently rank among the country’s outstanding medical schools.

TAUs School of Medicine offers the following medical programs:

 Health Professions Foundation Program (HPFP)
 Bachelors of Medicine & Bachelor of Surgery Program

Health Professions Foundation Program (HPFP) 
Health Professionals Foundation Program (HPFP) is a one-year full-time enrichment program preparing aspiring students to enter Texila American University College of Medicine. It’s a foundational program designed to strengthen students’ academic proficiency in basic sciences and career development, helping them to start their medical careers successfully.

The foundation course provides students an opportunity to systematically get acquainted with wide-ranging concepts in natural sciences, behavioural sciences, and medical terminologies, with a strong foundation in medical science.

The foundation medical courses at TAU-Zambia, have been structured to help students enhance their knowledge with hands-on exposure, encouraging them to think and learn beyond conventional approaches to shape their future as healthcare professionals with expert guidance from qualified mentors.

The HPFP is an essential program for stepping into medical courses in Zambia and qualifies students aspiring to join MBChB, nursing and pharmacology, and many more programs.

Bachelors of Medicine & Bachelor of Surgery Program (MBChB Program) 
MBChB in South Africa is a highly challenging and equally rewarding program equipping you with the medical, clinical, and research skills for pursuing a career in the field of medicine.

Texila American University’s MBChB program educates, trains, and prepares students for efficient practice in the healthcare systems. We are one of the leading medical schools in Zambia, employing wide-ranging teaching and learning methodologies to help our students become proactive learners.

The bachelor of health science program integrates theoretical science and experiential learning with clinical exposure and in-depth knowledge about the intricacies of the human body to help you apply scientific knowledge and concepts to your clinical practice.

Study the best MBChB program that will equip you to apply learnings and intellectual and practical skills to understand and manage the complex healthcare requirements of individuals and society and build resilience to meet the demands of the constantly transitioning healthcare landscape.

TAU offers the best MBChB degree in South Africa with a global reputation for excellence in teaching and research, enabling you to meet the core requirements for pursuing residency programs.

We believe in creating excellence through creativity and innovation and providing our students with wide-ranging career choices. We are fully committed to broadening the development process of students through teaching and research.

Public Health Programs 
We focus on educating and nurturing resourceful leaders in public health, fostering creativity, curiosity, and critical thinking in a vibrant and inclusive environment. Students gain exposure to various environmental conditions that impact health outcomes. A public health degree provides the necessary foundation equipping you with the learnings and skills needed to investigate wide-ranging issues.
TAUs School of Public Health offers the following programs:

 Bachelors in Public Health (BPH)
 Masters in Public Health (MPH)

Bachelors in Public Health (BPH) 
Medical professionals focus on treating diseases and injuries in individuals and helping them lead healthy lifestyles, while public health professionals proactively work to prevent them and ensure the well-being of communities. Public health bachelor’s degree enables you to understand the role of social, cultural, political, and geographical conditions in the well-being of the human population with exposure to epidemiology, environmental health, occupational health, health services administration, and behavioral science. It prepares students to develop, implement, and assess public health programs in different scenarios among diverse populations and take necessary measures to minimize health threats. The program enables you to investigate, design sensible public health policies and create campaigns that resonate with the audience and positively influence people worldwide.

It’s a unique blend of research, study, and measures bringing together people from across disciplines, backgrounds, and outlooks to uncover the root causes of health risks and develop long-lasting, innovative solutions that improve the quality of life of the global population.

The public health bachelor degree in Zambia augments your expertise to keep communities healthy, protect workers, tackle infectious diseases, pursue social justice, design public policies, spearhead disaster relief, ensure access to healthcare, and much more.

TAU Zambia offers the best public health graduate programs that empower students with the knowledge and skills required to improve health outcomes and experience a productive career or advance to specialise further in the area of public health and related fields.

The major prepares students for entry-level public health bachelor’s degree jobs and be at the forefront of research, practice, and service in nonprofits, community organisations, government, private sectors, and health care.

Master of Public Health (MPH) 
The Master in Public Health enables you to improve the well-being of communities, prevent illness and be at the forefront of a rapidly evolving field that touches all populations. Populations also conceive ingenious solutions to complex health challenges.

TAUs Masters of Public Health program equips students to protect and enhance the well-being of global populations. Students learn to tackle the challenging issues that affect communities, collaborate with people across sectors, and educate and create awareness about best practices to lead healthy lifestyles.

With an MPH degree, be qualified to investigate and analyze data, influence public policies, study and monitor health risks, and research various health aspects.

Our Master of Public Health course is a holistic program that encompasses core disciplines, enabling students to meet the requirements of professional accreditation standards in public health.

The Public Health Masters programs offer wide-ranging specializations which allow you to customize your learning to suit your interests with experiential learning to boost your professional career in public health practice or to pursue a career in academics.

TAU’s acclaimed  Master in Public Health course is taught by expert mentors from various disciplines, like epidemiology, statistics, health data science, public health, global health, psychology, sociology, philosophy, economics, and management. The student community encompasses an eclectic mix of individuals from various clinical, non-clinical, professional, and cultural backgrounds.

Under Graduate Degree Programs

Bachelor of Business Administration (BBA) 
The Bachelors Degree in Business Administration is a four-year program that prepares you for wide-ranging management and administrative roles. It provides a solid foundation in general management, accounting, marketing, operations, sales, finance, information technology, organizational behavior, and strategy, augmented with specialized electives that focus on key business aspects. It equips you with the knowledge and skills that employers value and enables you to launch your career with confidence.

The Business Administration Degree program is designed to meet the needs of rapidly transforming global business, encouraging students to discover innovative business solutions with an emphasis on critical management attributes like business analysis, quantitative reasoning, communication, and interpersonal skills.

Texila American University offers the best bachelor of business studies in Zambia, with a rigorous curriculum that covers core business functions, including leadership, strategy, operations, accounting, and marketing, preparing students for challenging job roles.

Bachelor of Science in Project Management 
The bachelor of science project management degree equips you with the technical and strategic expertise to manage wide-ranging projects from inception to completion across global markets utilizing strong business knowledge along with leadership and team development skills.

Successful companies need strong project managers to mold and materialize their ideas. Acquire the skills and expertise required to succeed in project management with a Project Management BS degree at Texila American University, which prepares you to lead and deliver projects to success within the specified duration, requirements, and budget in the contemporary business landscape.

The Project Management BS Degree Program has a rigorous curriculum, enabling you to gain expertise to improve management outcomes encompassing scope, time, cost, risk, communications, quality, procurements, resources, and project integration.

The BS in project management certification program trains you with the foundations of theoretical and technical aspects required to analyze business needs, determine appropriate solutions and evaluate the implications of organizations based on the efficacy of managing projects. Also, skillfully design communication strategies with stakeholders and strategically build strong teams.

Bachelor of Science in Marketing 
Marketing is vital for any business it’s about the different approaches that help a company create and deliver value to its customers. TAUs Bachelor of science in marketing enables you to understand market research, customer preferences, global marketing challenges, and various marketing activities and develop the critical thinking skills to make an impact sustainably to excel in the competitive business landscape.

With changing customer dynamics and ever-increasing choices for products/services in the contemporary world, businesses need professionals with strong marketing skills.

Marketing Degree Programs equip you with the essential skills to succeed in wide-ranging marketing careers irrespective of the type of organization since it includes myriad activities used by every business.

B.Sc. in Marketing covers personal selling, advertising, sales promotions, consumer behavior, market research, internet marketing, ethical practices, strategic marketing, and much more. Bachelor of Science in Marketing jobs include advertising and social media marketing, marketing research, product management, retailing, and sales leadership.

Bachelor of Science in Finance and Accounting 
TAUs Bachelor of Science Degree in Finance and Accounting uniquely blends accounting, finance, and business concepts, preparing you for worthwhile careers in business and financial sectors. It fosters an entrepreneurial mindset and financial expertise, enabling you to impact global economies with new perspectives and solutions.

TAU, Zambia, offers the best degree in BSc Finance and Accounting, which equips you to examine financial records, evaluate risks, and handle tax laws with exposure to the fundamental principles and theories of accounting and gain practical experience preparing financial documents.

Bachelor’s Degree in Finance and Accounting helps you explore career opportunities in diverse sectors, like manufacturing, information technology, private establishments, or government agencies as accountants, auditors, financial advisors, or financial managers.

With disruptive technologies transforming business processes, a Bachelor of Science in Accounting and Finance provides accounting professionals with a broad understanding of technology, business analytics, sustainability, and innovation to stand out from the crowd and withstand competition.

Postgraduate Degree Program

Master of Science in Project Management 
The Masters in Project Management degree equips students with the technical and strategic expertise to manage projects end-to-end across global markets.

The masters degree in project management online prepares you with the necessary skills and tools to effectively lead your organization to handle volatile, ambiguous, or complex projects. Our curriculum enhances your understanding of project management tools, organizational strategies, and theoretical concepts with a hands-on approach. It also provides a deep-insights into the subject through research and innovative project management concepts.

Texila American University offers the best MSc in project management degree in Zambia, which prepares qualified professionals for project management roles at various levels of organizations that facilitate the design, construction, and operations of projects in the public and private market sectors of the built environment.

The Master’s Degree in Project Management online is a comprehensive program that produces versatile leaders with knowledge in fundamental concepts of development, design, and construction practices with functional concepts of management and behavioral science.

The masters in project management courses are designed specifically for entry to intermediate-level professionals and taught by qualified professionals with exposure to real-world scenarios, case studies, and contemporary challenges of the constantly evolving field.

Master of Science in Banking and Insurance 
The online Masters in Banking and Insurance is a specialized dual postgraduate degree program that opens you to the quantitative approaches and analytical and technical aspects of banking and insurance. MSc Banking and Insurance in Zambia covers different elements of the finance, banking, and insurance markets and methodically exposes you to researching and analyzing international economic trends, investments, assets, financial markets, stocks, shares, liabilities, etc.

Following the 2007-2009 global financial crisis, professionals with advanced industry knowledge and mastery in the areas of finance, banking, and insurance are in high demand. TAUs MS in Banking and Insurance is ideal for aspiring private advisers and financial analysts working in banking, finance, financial services, investment banking, insurance, and other related areas.

Customer preferences have evolved over the decade with increasing demands and expectations of exceptional experiences at all touchpoints of various financial products. Our Postgraduate degree in Banking and Insurance equips banking professionals with the necessary skills to help them ride the wave of change and have a rewarding career in the banking and insurance sector or progress to specialize further in this critical field.

Part time MBA 
MBA Program at TAU  incorporates various management skills to the students in a more interactive manner. The program will equip the students to face the business environment with lot of confidence and also will kindle the underlying skills of the students to face the global business challenges.

Department of Information Technology

Texila American University’s Bachelor of Science in Information Technology prepares you to succeed and be competitive in the rapidly evolving field of IT, enabling you to acquire valuable knowledge and hands-on skills in the latest technologies sought by employers worldwide.

Our bachelor of information technology enables you to advance your knowledge with a focus on experiential learning led by highly qualified mentors with decades of experience in the Information Technology sector.

We strive to deliver world-class education to enable our students to craft their unique career pathways. TAUs Information Technology courses in Zambia are one of the most in-demand bachelor’s degrees with an extensive curriculum that includes programming, software development, information systems, database development, computer networking, operating systems, and more. We also focus on strengthening your core business attributes like project management, business communications, group dynamics, and organization skills,

Bachelor’s degree in Information Technology enhances your critical thinking and enables you to provide rational solutions to complex issues seamlessly integrating technology, business, and management aspects. It also exposes you to the social, ethical, and policy dimensions of technology in every facet of business and society.

Our bachelor of science program will help you jumpstart into the IT landscape with the essential learnings and skills preparing you for a thriving career in the areas of web and mobile computing, security, cloud computing, data management, software systems development, software systems analysis, artificial intelligence, or systems administration.

Texila American University Consortium (TAU – C)

Texila American University Consortium is a Private Educational Group of Universities and Campuses Strategically Spread Across Countries and Continents. Incepted in 2010, the TAU Consortium has campuses in Guyana, Zambia and Fujairah (United Arab Emirates) and Offices in India, USA, Sharjah, Zambia, Hong-Kong and Philippines.   
The Portfolio of the TAU Consortium includes the following:

Texila American University
Texila American University Guyana
Texila American University Zambia
Texila American University Distance & Blended Learning Programs
Texila American University College of Post Graduate Medicine
Taksha Smart Labz Online Tutoring
Texila e-Journal
Texila e-Conference
Texila e-Learning

References

External links 

 https://zm.tauedu.org

Universities in Zambia
International universities
International schools in Zambia
2016 establishments in Zambia
Educational institutions established in 2016
Medical schools in Zambia